CGTN Documentary (formerly CCTV-9 Documentary) is a Chinese pay television channel operated by the China Global Television Network (CGTN) group, owned by Chinese state broadcaster China Central Television (CCTV). The channel broadcasts documentaries in the English language, and is China's first state-level English-language documentary channel to broadcast globally.

It used to share the "CCTV-9" name with its sister documentary channel in Mandarin Chinese. The channel has also been known to carry some Mandarin-language programmes with English subtitles; it broadcasts new programming between 7:00pm and 11:00pm Beijing time, and repeats archival programming at other times.

Availability
In Macau, the digital terrestrial television operator TDM relays the channel on channel 74.
In Hong Kong, the city's public broadcaster RTHK used to simulcast the channel as RTHK TV 33 terrestrially in both digital and analogue formats, but on 29 May 2017, RTHK began simulcasting a separate version of CCTV-1 in its place after a short filler. The CGTN Documentary simulcast were resumed from 1 July 2022, this time on digital-only channel 34.

In Pakistan, the channel is aired on different cable systems, including the PTCL (Pakistan Tele Communication Landline).

In Europe it can be received unencrypted by satellites Hotbird and Astra and in Italy on platform Tivùsat at LCN 88.

Programs
Programs being aired including:
 China's Mega Structures
 Blades of Grass
 Rebuilding the Kakarkorum Highway
 Aerial China
 A History of China
 A Dove Tree
 Going the Distance
 Animal Aid
 Silk Road

References

External links

China Global Television Network channels
Television channels and stations established in 2011
2011 establishments in China
Documentary television channels